Urangaua is a genus of beetles in the family Cerambycidae, containing the following species:

 Urangaua analis (Melzer, 1935)
 Urangaua subanalis (Zajciw, 1964)

References

Acanthoderini